The 33rd Filipino Academy of Movie Arts and Sciences Awards Night was held in 1986 in the Philippines. The event recognizes outstanding achievements in the Filipino movie industry for the prior year.

Paradise Inn won the most awards including the FAMAS Award for Best Picture and best director for Celso Ad Castillo. Eddie Romero and George Canseco were elevated to the Hall of Fame for winning more than five times on their respective category.

Awards

Major Awards
Winners are listed first and highlighted with boldface.

Special Awardee

Hall of Fame Awardee
Eddie Romero - Screenplay
1985 - Ang Padrino
1981 - Aguila
1980 - Durugin Si Totoy Bato
1967 - The Passionate Strangers
1953- Buhay Alamang

Bida Sa Takilya
Sharon Cuneta 

Hall of Fame Awardee
George Canseco - Theme Song
1985 - Dapat Ka Bang Mahalin?
1984 - Paano Ba Ang Mangarap?
1983 - Gaano Kadalas Ang Minsan?
1981 - Langis At Tubig
1980 - Huwag, Bayaw

Best Dressed Movie Star (Bida Ng Gabi) 
Lorna Tolentino

References

External links
FAMAS Awards 

FAMAS Award
FAMAS
FAMAS